Lake Johnson is a small lake near the suburb of Frankton in Queenstown in the South Island of New Zealand. It has no inflow or outflow and is classified as a glacial lake.

References 

Lakes of Otago